White demographic decline is a decrease in the White populace as a percentage of the total population in a city, state, subregion, or nation. It has been recorded in a number of countries and smaller jurisdictions. For example, according to their national censuses, White Americans, White Canadians, White Latin Americans, and White people in the United Kingdom are in demographic decline in the United States, Canada, Latin America, and the United Kingdom, respectively. White demographic decline can also be observed in other countries including Australia, New Zealand, South Africa, Germany, Spain, Italy, and Zimbabwe.

Scholars have attempted to address subfactors and anticipated results of White demographic decline in relevant societies. The term majority minority has been used to designate an area where a decline, of what are nationally defined as Whites, has resulted in a former majority becoming a minority. Examples of this include parts of the United States and Brazil. Other notable concepts include demographer Eric Kaufmann's theory of "Whiteshift", which predicts transforming classifications of Whiteness as mixed-race majorities emerge, and social psychologist Jennifer Richeson's research into racial shift conditions, which outline how White people's hostility to other racial groups increases in proportion to their awareness of a drop in White population share.

Experts in extremism and terrorism have shown national demography in relation to white people to be subject to exploitation by both radical and political right-wing groups, including adherence to conspiracy theories. This has also manifested as anti-abortion, and anti-immigrant sentiment. Academic evidence indicates that immigration significantly contributes to the maintenance of economies, civic institutions, and population levels of places affected by White demographic decline, such as in the Southern United States.

Overview

Definition
White demographic decline has been statistically observed by academics in relation to countries which conduct a national census and include a white racial or ethnic category. Notable experts and scholars of a multitude of fields of study have observed the demographic phenomenon of falling white demography. These include anthropologists Leo Chavez, Arizona State University's Luis Plascencia, Rich Benjamin, and University of Louisville's Steven Gardiner. Demographers such as William H. Frey, Eric Kaufmann, Rogelio Sáenz, Dudley L. Poston Jr., Ann Morning, and David Coleman.

Social geographers such as Loughborough University's Marco Antonsich, and Syracuse University's Jamie Winders, and political scientists Elliot Jager, and Robert Pape, have studied white demographic decline as a measurable and observable process. Historians Trevor Burnard, and Mark Sedgwick have published works defining the demographic process in various jurisdictions. While they suggest that the white population share is falling in the United States, sociologist Richard Alba and demographer Dowell Myers have stated that this decline is divisive and exaggerated somewhat by the census format. Nonetheless, many academics, such as Nicholas Lemann, suggest the decline will affect national election results in the US.

Demography in national censuses
Various national demographic analyses measured a demographic decline of white populations, as defined by their local nation-based censuses. Research conducted at the University of Minnesota has observed the phenomenon of a decrease in white population share within jurisdictions in Europe, North America and Oceania:

According to the most recent U.S. census, the non-Hispanic White population is shrinking (US Census Bureau, 2018). This trend has been observed in other White-majority countries including Canada (Statistics Canada, 2017), the UK (Coleman, 2016), and New Zealand (Stats New Zealand, 2004).

Regarding white populations internationally, and particularly in the Western world, demographer Eric Kaufmann has suggested that "In an era of unprecedented white demographic decline it is absolutely vital for it to have a democratic outlet." While sociologist Richard Alba believes this decline is exaggerated by the racial classification system used in the United States Census, regarding the  2020 census, demographer William H. Frey has written:

The Census Bureau was not projecting white population losses to occur until after 2024. This makes any national population growth even more reliant on other race and ethnic groups. The white demographic decline is largely attributable to its older age structure when compared to other race and ethnic groups. This leads to fewer births and more deaths relative to its population size.

Statistical terms

Majority minority

As well as referencing ethno-cultural, linguistic, and religious demography, the term 'majority minority' has consistently been used in racial contexts in media and academia, and specifically to identify the demographic decline of white populations. In 2010, it was reported by the BBC how "America's two largest states - California and Texas - became "majority-minority" states (with an overall minority population outnumbering the white majority)" between 1998 and 2004.

Demographers Rogelio Sáenz and Dudley L. Poston Jr. have studied existing states which have gained white minorities in the 21st century, and how, from 2017 onwards, an ongoing falling white population-share predicts further US states to follow this trend: "nonwhites account for more than half of the populations of Hawaii, the District of Columbia, California, New Mexico, Texas and Nevada. In the next 10 to 15 years, these half-dozen 'majority-minority' states will likely be joined by as many as eight other states where whites now make up less than 60 percent of the population." From their research, Sáenz and Poston Jr expect the United States to have progressed to overall white minority demography by 2044. Regarding various projected majority minority scenarios across the Western world, in a 2018 article for the London School of Economics, academics Eric Kaufmann and Matthew Goodwin wrote:

The ethnic make-up of many western countries is changing, and in countries previously seen as having 'white' majorities that past predominance is declining. In the United States, Canada and New Zealand, the 'majority-minority' point will arrive around 2050, while in western Europe it is projected to occur towards the end of the century. Some commentators have asked if this change may lead to a growing reaction or 'white backlash'. All else being equal, we suggest that the answer may be yes.

An example from the developing world includes Brazil which, due to a long-term demographic decline of white Brazilians, has been designated as a majority-minority country in relation to the South American nation's racial classification of whiteness.

Racial shift condition
In their widely cited research, professors Jennifer Richeson and Maureen Craig produced a 2014 study on white racial shift conditions. White people who were informed of their diminishing demographic share of the population displayed more racial hostility to perceived external racial groups. Pacific Standard described the research as how "the coming racial shift evokes higher levels of both explicit and implicit racism on the part of white Americans". In analysis of the study, sociologist Mary C. Waters concurred that the portrayal in media of falling white demography was linked with subsequent discrimination against non-whites.

Whiteshift

Demographer Eric Kaufmann's theory of whiteshift predicts that as white demographic decline gradually results in white majorities becoming minorities (sometimes called a majority minority scenario) that a broader and more inclusive classification of white people will occur. A professor of politics at Birkbeck College, he suggests that, given the appropriate societal conditions, both conservatives and cosmopolitans may be able to observe whiteshift as a positive factor. In this regard, political analyst Michael Barone believes there may be "cautious optimism" that the social phenomenon can progress in a politically stable form.

Analysing Kaufmann's thesis, historian Michael Burleigh  has used examples of whiteshift such as Western politicians Iain Duncan Smith, Geert Wilders and Ted Cruz, who have some degree of what might be considered non-white or ethnic minority ancestry in their respective countries. Demographer Dowell Myers has also referenced Cruz and Megan Markle as examples, claiming that "whites are indeed in numerical decline" in the United States, when judged upon a criterion of exclusively European ancestry.

Demography by regions

Europe

United Kingdom

In 2013, Demos published research analyzing the 2011 United Kingdom census. The UK-based think tank detailed how "departing White British are replaced by immigration or by the natural growth of the minority population. Over time, the end result of this process is a spiral of White British demographic decline".

Academic David Coleman has produced research which demonstrates that the cities of Leicester and Birmingham will join London in their majority minority status during the 2020s, with regards to the demographic decline of White people in Britain. Coleman, a University of Oxford demography professor since 1980, estimates that by 2056, the trend of a declining share of the white populace will result in the United Kingdom having an overall white minority.

North America

Canada

In 2018, scholars Eric Kaufmann and Matthew Goodwin wrote that the demographic process would result in White Canadians being in the minority by around 2050.

United States

While under 18 non-Hispanic White Americans in the US. are already a minority as of 2020, it is projected that non-Hispanic Whites overall will become a minority within the US by 2045.

Political impact
The political right has been reported to be most inclined to reference white demographic decline in a political context, with 2022 communication-research outlining how fears of white-related demography are often weaponised. Max Hui Bai, a scholar working within Stanford University's Polarization and Social Change Lab, has explored "how people react to the numerical decline of white populations" across the Western world.

Sociologist and demographer Ann Morning has suggested that representations of female multiraciality have been used in media to show evidence of "racial progress" and "bridging racial divides", while also providing a function which "serves to soften the blow of White demographic decline". Professor Trevor Burnard has discussed how "white demographic decline" occurred in the population of the colony of Jamaica between 1655 and 1780, stating that his research "presents hard data on white mortality in seventeenth- and eighteenth-century Jamaica" and its political implications. In modern times, journalist Sabrina Tavernise has reported that since the 2020 US Census, regarding white demography, social scientists have pointed out that the "declining share of white people as a part of the population has become a part of American politics — as a worry on the right and a cause for optimism on the left."

Africa

South Africa
Scholars Hermann Giliomee and Lawrence Schlemmer have credited, among other factors, international pressure on the apartheid government and "a white demographic decline" for facilitating the process of negotiations to end apartheid in South Africa.

Europe
Adela Fofiu of Babeș-Bolyai University has noted how right-wing organizations and outlets in Romania politicize white demographic decline, attempting to associate it with concepts such as the "Islamization of Europe" or "Gypsifcation" of the country, the latter of which refers to the Romani people in Romania. In 2018 analysis, the Southern Poverty Law Center explored how right-wing extremism in Europe attempts to utilize the continents demographic decline and the rise of immigration from Arab and or Middle Eastern countries for political gain. A professor at Loughborough University, Marco Antonsich's research in Italy suggests that "demographic change and the decline of white majorities" provides space for immigrant communities to" justify their national belonging and to rewrite the nation".

United Kingdom
In 2018, Eric Kaufmann wrote a piece for the New Statesman on the demographic decline of White British people within the United Kingdom, stating that "Three-quarters of people in Britain in 2150 will, like myself, be mixed-race." and highlighted political consequences of such a transformation taking place:  When whites can't express their sense of ethnic loss, they turn to the seemingly more "respectable" alternatives of demonising Muslims, criticising immigrants who live in minority neighbourhoods, or voting for Brexit (a result of diverting concerns over ethnic change into hatred of the acceptably "white" EU). Few things have contributed more to today's populist blowback than the demographic blind spot in Western political thought. 

In 2020, Nick Timothy, a former Downing Street Chief of Staff, addressed societal consequences of the ongoing demographic decline of white people in the United Kingdom:

This is a difficult issue to understand and address, but the anxiety is real. White people are as attached to their ethnic and cultural identity as any other group and, faced with the reality of rapid demographic decline, many feel a sense of loss.

North America

Canada
Writing in 2019, journalist Margaret Wente has suggested that "nations upended by right-wing populism all have one thing in common. They are all facing white demographic decline. And that is the breeding ground for populist revolts." Wente argues that with significant projected decline of the white share of the population in Canada, the country will have to address reactionary populist politics.

United States
In 1998 research, Fordham University professor Tanya K. Hernandez outlined the potential for multiracial Americans to have their representative US census category "co-opted by the larger society as a mechanism for constructing a buffer class to maintain White privilege, in the midst of a growing concern with the demographic decline of White U.S. residents". Samuel P. Huntington's 2004 book Who Are We? The Challenges to America's National Identity addressed the emerging population change in the United States. In an analysis on Huntington's treatise, political demographer Eric Kaufmann wrote:

Finally, Huntington considers the possibility of a white nationalist response to the changes taking place. He says that white nativism is a "plausible" response to white demographic decline, the cosmopolitan defection of the white elite and the fading power of the Anglo-Protestant core.

By 2010, the Southern Poverty Law Center's 1,000 organizations listed within their "hate" and "nativist" archives predominantly involved politics referencing white demography. Arizona State University anthropologist Luis Plascencia wrote that "a common thread in many of these groups is the concern with the demographic decline of 'white' individuals". In 2009, Stanford University professor Eamonn Callan observed that:

The slow but inexorable demographic decline of white Americans to the status of one minority among others has begun to register in popular consciousness, making it harder for anyone to suppose that American identity could still be white identity.

In the mid-2010s, white people's demographic decline became increasing associated with politics in relation to the 2016 presidential election. Donald Trump's policy positions and rhetoric were seen by some scholars as giving an outlet to anxiety based upon this changing white demography. Journalist Christopher Caldwell argued that perceived cultural celebration of the process had contributed to the political energies supporting candidate Trump. Caldwell wrote that "At the same time, white demographic decline has been accompanied in many quarters with official exultation. The promise is not to enrich white America with new ethnicities but to replace it."
Research has predicted a rise in rhetoric regarding issues such as protectionism among white Americans, and particularly white evangelicals, in proportion with the ongoing percentage-share reduction of whites. This demographic decline has also been utilized by extremist commentators, such as explicit supporters of the "alt-right" or white supremacist movements.

In this regard, research in historian Mark Sedgwick's Key Thinkers of the Radical Right indicated that elements of the extremist right-wing believed that Trump's proposed policies, such as the Trump travel ban or the wall, would "slow white demographic decline". Similarly, Aurora University professor Faith Agostinone-Wilson's On the Question of Truth in the Era of Trump describes these types of political aspirations as "an Americanized version of salvation, where White demographic decline is halted and the country is purged of the Other". Anthropologist Rich Benjamin has suggested that the "Trump administration has aimed its rhetoric at a slice of aggrieved white Americans who are panicked about their demographic decline", while political scientist Elliot Jager has written:

Trump directs his appeal at disenfranchised working-class Americans by telling them that he'll "make America great again", intimating that he'll reverse the demographic decline of whites by "humanely" deporting 11 million mostly Hispanic, illegal aliens; will protect the homeland by banning Muslims from entering, and will build an impenetrable barrier on the Mexican border.

After the inauguration of President Trump, a March 2017 New Republic article examined Chief Strategist Steve Bannon's advocacy for the 1973 book The Camp of the Saints, which it described as "an explicitly racist novel, saturated in deep fear at the prospect of white demographic decline".

In the 2020s, study of American politics increasingly factored in the demographic reduction in analysing the Republican Party's electoral success and future strategy. For example, in analysis of the 2020 presidential election results, University of Melbourne professor Timothy J. Lynch suggests "white demographic decline need not spell disaster for the GOP. Despite his dog-whistle racism, Trump performed better than expected among Black voters." In relation to the party's future direction, UCLA's political scientist Gary Segura notes that "Republicans nationally receive 85 percent of their votes from white voters by capturing between 55 and 60 percent of their ballots in each election", adding that "with the demographic decline of white voters, even 60 percent of that cohort will be a poor start when it comprises just two-thirds of the electorate in 2024". Professor Nicholas Lemann also argues that high motivation and corresponding turnout from the Republican Party's supporter base would be required to offset the ongoing demographic decline of whites by the 2024 election.

Interviewed by Jeffrey Goldberg in 2020, the director of the documentary film White Noise proposed that the decline of whites had become the most significant driving force in the politics of the US. Daniel Lombroso stated "There is a deep-seated fear of white demographic decline in this country, and obviously in Europe. And I think that is now the defining fault line in American politics". Brittany Farr, a Sharswood Fellow at Penn Law, suggests that reporting on US Census results (regarding falling white demography) by journalistic outlets, such as the New York Times and Wall Street Journal, are communicating "a sense of inevitability with respect to white demographic decline".

Academic study on reactions
In the United States, responses to the demographic decline of white people have been studied with regard to its affect on the political ideologies of white populations, including recording individual reactions to specific issues, such as welfare, terrorism or ethnic group preference. Sociologists Bart Bonikowski and Yueran Zhang note that:
	
One major source of perceived racial threat is demographic change. Experimental studies have shown that when exposed to information about white demographic decline or increased racial diversity, white respondents express more negative attitudes towards other racial groups (Craig and Richeson 2014b;  Enos 2014; Outten et al. 2012)
	
A March 2020 research article found that whites in the US were more likely to expand classification of whiteness to include white Latin Americans "when their privileged social status is threatened, for example, by the prospect of numeric decline". July 2020 research showed that white Americans who are informed of the projected minority status of whites in the United States are more likely to support the torture of terrorist suspects.

2021 United States Capitol attack
In 2021, political scientist Robert Pape identified that of the 716 people charged or arrested for storming the Capitol Building in Washington, D.C., they had travelled predominantly "from counties where the white share of the population is declining fastest". In the aftermath of the attack, Tech Against Terrorism published evidence that white demographic decline was being used as a statistical example by the far right to radicalize Trump supporters.

Extremist exploitation of demography

Anti-abortion movement
In Katha Pollitt's 2015 book Pro, the essayist links anxiety with the demographic trend of whites and correlating support for the anti-abortion movement. Hampshire College professor Marlene Fried's research suggests Pollitt exposed the "underlying agenda of the antiabortion movement", recognizing that it was associated with white demographic decline and its subsequent effects on sections of the populace.

Anti-immigration politics
University of Louisville's anthropology professor Steven Gardiner has proposed how:

The decline in white fertility, however, is only a small part of the story. The narrative of white demographic decline is being written, primarily, in the language of immigration. It is only since Congress passed the Immigration and Naturalization Act Amendments of 1965 that American racial and ethnic demographics have taken the turn sketched above (Office of Immigration Statistics 2004, 5). Passed during the Johnson Administration, during the height of the Civil Rights era, the 1965 Act repealed the most blatantly racist aspects of the Immigration Act of 1924. It abolished the national origins quotas which had, quite intentionally, limited non-white and non-European immigration to the United States.

Based on the effect of immigration on white demography, academic Jamie Winders has written how anti-immigrant sentiment is "grounded more in rhetoric than logic and often operates outside the boundaries of what actual research shows." Winders, a professor of geography at Syracuse University, notes that, for example: "In rural communities in the South, immigration often keeps smaller towns afloat, maintaining local schools, populations, and economies in the face of white demographic decline." In 2020, research from University of Guadalajara's Alejandro Canales confirmed similar findings in the southern US. Canales, an expert on migration and population, wrote:

The current case of California, Texas, Florida, Arizona, New Mexico and Nevada are a clear indication of what we are affirming. In all of these states the traditional demographic supremacy of non-Hispanic white people practically has been diluted by the influence of Mexican and Latin-American immigration.

Conspiracy theories

Scholars have studied how the demographic decline of white people, as well as its portrayal within different types of media, have contributed towards adherence to racist and disproven conspiracy theories. Harvard University fellow José Pedro Zúquete has observed that:
For many years in the American extreme right subculture a putative Jewish conspiracy - reified by the notion of ZOG or Zionist Occupation Government - was often invoked to explain the demographic decline of whites in America.

In 2019, scholar Monica Toft expanded on the emergence of nativist politics and conspiracy theory advocacy in relation to the demographic phenomenon, stating that "The 'why now' of white nativism is due to decades of demographic decline for white Americans combined with a serious decline in public education standards that leads to unwarranted nostalgia and openness to conspiracy theories." Academic Robert Pape has suggested that one of the conspiracy theories which weaponizes falling white population-share is The Great Replacement.

Terrorism

The Combating Terrorism Center, which is an academic institution within the United States Military Academy, has published research which recognizes anxiety regarding white demographic decline as an ongoing contributing motivation to terrorism in the Western world. An example of this was observed in the Christchurch mosque attacks in New Zealand. Mark Durie argues that the Christchurch terrorist intended to frame the demographic decline of white people as a "crisis" which would "incite conflict so that whites will be compelled to awaken, radicalise and grow strong." Durie, a linguistics and theology scholar, wrote: "We need to understand this ideology, not to give it a platform, but to learn and to equip ourselves to stand against such hatred." In August 2019, a man arrested for threatening to attack people at a Jewish community center in Ohio had been found to have appeared in a documentary speaking about white demographic decline in the United States and Europe.

See also
 White genocide conspiracy theory
 Great Replacement

References

 
Demographics of Canada
Demographics of the United Kingdom
Demographics of the United States
Demographics
People of European descent
Majority–minority relations
White culture
Western culture
Population decline